Aliyavada railway station is a railway station on the Western Railway network in the state of Gujarat, India. Aliyavada railway station is 19 km far away from Jamnagar railway station. Passenger and Superfast trains halt at Aliyavada railway station.

Nearby stations 

 is nearest railway station towards , whereas  is nearest railway station towards .

Trains 

The following Superfast train halts at Aliyavada railway station in both directions:

 22945/46 Okha - Mumbai Central Saurashtra Mail

References

See also
 Jamnagar district

Railway stations in Jamnagar district
Rajkot railway division